The Maine Black Bears men's basketball team is the basketball team that represents University of Maine in Orono, Maine, United States.  The school's team currently competes in the America East Conference, which they joined upon its founding in 1979. Their current head coach is Chris Markwood, who took over in March 2022.

The Black Bears are one of 35 eligible Division I programs to have never appeared in the NCAA Division I men's basketball tournament; their 78 seasons without a postseason bid is sixth most all-time among the teams in the drought.

Coaches

Rivalries 
 University of New Hampshire Wildcats – Maine's rivalry with UNH is the longest continuous rivalry between two non-Ivy League schools, lasting 116 seasons as of 2020.

Team records

Single Season records

Career records

Notable players
John Rupert, Accomplished 17 shooting records in a single season
Rufus Harris, 1979–80 America East Conference Player of the Year
Noam Laish (born 1993), Israeli basketball player

References

External links
 

 
Basketball teams established in 1904
1904 establishments in Maine